Histura perseavora is a species of moth of the family Tortricidae. It is found in Guatemala.

The length of the forewings is 5–5.5 mm. The forewings have a two-toned pattern, with the darker proximal one-third distinguished from the lighter distal two-thirds by an oblique line. The hindwings are dingy greyish white.

Larvae were reared from either fruit, fruit pedicels, or young green branches of Persea americana. They have a cream pink body and amber head. Full-grown larvae reach a length of 6–7 mm.

References

Moths described in 2010
Polyorthini